The William & Mary Tribe women's soccer teams represent The College of William & Mary in National Collegiate Athletic Association (NCAA) Division I competition. Located in Williamsburg, Virginia, United States, the women's soccer program began its official participation as a varsity sport in 1981. The first head coach was John Charles, who led the program for five seasons and compiled a 50–29–11 overall record. In 1986, Englishman John Daly took over and continued on his predecessor's success. Daly is still the head coach through the 2009 season.

Starting in 1984, the Tribe earned berths into the NCAA Women's Soccer Championship in every season for the rest of the 1980s. In 1987 and 1989 they made their way to the Elite 8, making them one of only eight teams remaining in the college soccer season.



1981

1982

1983

1984

1985

1986

1987

1988

1989

1981